Zia Shaoul  (born in Habbaniyah) is a former Iraqi football midfielder who played for Iraq at the 1957 Pan Arab Games. In 1960, he left Iraq and joined with Eintracht Frankfurt of then West Germany.

Shaoul played for Iraq between 1957 and 1959.

References

Iraqi footballers
Iraq international footballers
Living people
Association football midfielders
Iraqi Assyrian people
Iraqi expatriate footballers
Expatriate footballers in Germany
Eintracht Frankfurt players
Al-Mina'a SC players
Iraqi Christians
Assyrian footballers
Year of birth missing (living people)